The Australian Research Council (ARC) is the primary non-medical research funding agency of the Australian Government, distributing more than  in grants each year. The Council was established by the Australian Research Council Act 2001, and provides competitive research funding to academics and researchers at Australian universities. Most health and medical research in Australia is funded by the more specialised National Health and Medical Research Council (NHMRC), which operates under a separate budget.

ARC does not directly fund researchers, but however allocates funds to individual schemes with specialised scopes, such as Discover (fundamental and empirical research) and Linkage (domestic and international collaborative projects). Most of these schemes fall under the National Competitive Grants Program (NCGP), whereby institutions must compete amongst each other for funding. ARC also administers the Excellence in Research for Australia framework (ERA), which provides guidelines to evaluate the quality of research. ARC Centres of Excellence, funded for a limited period, are collaborations established among Australian and international universities and other institutions to support research in a variety of fields.

Since 2011, ARC has awarded the annual Kathleen Fitzpatrick Australian Laureate Fellowship and the Georgina Sweet Australian Laureate Fellowship, which are research fellowships for female Australian and international researchers, intended to support innovative research programs and mentor early career researchers.

History and governance 
The Australian Research Council superseded the Australian Research Grants Committee, which had been providing funding to Australian universities since 1965. It was formed in 1988 as a response to the Dawkins white paper, ‘Higher Education: A policy statement’, and was established as an independent body in 2001 under the Australian Research Council Act 2001.

 the agency is administered by the Department of Education, Skills and Employment, headed by the Minister for Education and Youth.

The ARC's mission is to deliver policy and programs that advance Australian research and innovation globally and benefit the community. It supports research across all disciplines except clinical and other medical and dental research, for which the National Health and Medical Research Council (NHMRC) is primarily responsible.

Research integrity

ARC updates its own Research Integrity Policy, which includes referral to the Australian Research Integrity Committee (ARIC) where necessary. The Australian Research Integrity Committee (ARIC) is an independent body, jointly established by the ARC and the NHMRC, to provide a system to review institutional responses to allegations of research misconduct.

Functional areas

National Competitive Grants Program 
ARC funds research and researchers under the National Competitive Grants Program (NCGP). Funding opportunities administered by the ARC include the Australian Laureate Fellowship.

The NCGP comprises two main elements—Discovery and Linkage—under which the ARC funds a range of complementary schemes to support researchers at different stages of their careers, build Australia’s research capability, expand and enhance research networks and collaborations, and develop centres of research excellence.

Excellence in Research for Australia 

ARC administers Excellence in Research for Australia (ERA), Australia’s national research evaluation framework, which is tasked with identifying and promoting excellence across the full spectrum of research activity in higher education institutions in Australia.

Linkage program 
The ARC runs various funding schemes under the banner of Linkage Programs, which encourage research collaborations between researchers and a range of different types of organisations, including private enterprise, community organisations and other research agencies. The Linkage programs include ARC Centres of Excellence, Linkage Projects, and Special Research Initiatives. and

Centres of excellence 

Funded by the ARC for a limited period (often seven years), Centres of Excellence (CoE) are large-scale, multi-institutional collaborations established among Australian and international universities, research organisations, governments and businesses, to support research across a number of fields. Recent funding rounds have occurred in 2011, 2014, 2017 and 2020.

Centres of Excellence funded in 2020:

 ARC Centre of Excellence for Automated Decision-Making and Society (ADMS)
 ARC Centre of Excellence for Children and Families over the Life Course 
 ARC Centre of Excellence for Dark Matter Particle Physics
 ARC Centre of Excellence for the Digital Child
 ARC Centre of Excellence for Enabling Eco-Efficient Beneficiation of Minerals
 ARC Centre of Excellence for Innovations in Peptide and Protein Science
 ARC Centre of Excellence for Plant Success in Nature and Agriculture
 ARC Centre of Excellence in Synthetic Biology
 ARC Centre of Excellence for Transformative Meta-Optical Systems

Continuing Centres include:

ARC Centre of Australian Biodiversity and Heritage (CABAH), 2017–
ARC Centre of Excellence for the Dynamics of Language (COEDL), 2014 - 
ARC Centre of Excellence for the History of Emotions (CHE), 2011–
ARC Centre of Excellence in Population Ageing Research (CEPAR), 2011–
ARC Centre of Excellence in Future Low-Energy Electronics Technologies (FLEET), 2017–

Past ARC Centres of Excellence include:
 The Centre for Cross-Cultural Research (CCR) at the Australian National University, cited as an "ARC Special Research Centre focussing on scholarly and public understandings of cross-cultural relations and histories, particularly but not exclusively in Australia and in the immediate region", existed from 1997/8 to around 2006/7. Anthropologist Nicholas Thomas was its inaugural director.
ARC Centre for Complex Systems (ACCS), 2004–2009
ARC Centre of Excellence for Creative Industries and Innovation (CCI), 2005–2013
ARC Centre of Excellence for All-Sky Astrophysics (CAASTRO), 2011–2018

Gender equity 

Since 2011, the Australian Research Council has awarded two research fellowships for female Australian and international researchers and research leaders to build Australia's research capacity, undertake innovative research programs and mentor early career researchers. The Kathleen Fitzpatrick Australian Laureate Fellowship is awarded to a candidate from the humanities, arts and social science disciplines and the Georgina Sweet Australian Laureate Fellowship is awarded to a candidate from the science and technology disciplines.

Notes

References

External links 
 

Funding bodies of Australia
Scientific organisations based in Australia
Commonwealth Government agencies of Australia
Research in Australia